Mark Chapman may refer to:
 Mark Chapman (broadcaster) (born 1973), British sports journalist and presenter
 Mark Chapman (cricketer) (born 1994), Hong Kong and New Zealand cricketer
 Mark Chapman (theologian) (born 1960), British Anglican theologian
 Mark David Chapman (born 1955), American murderer of John Lennon
 Mark Lindsay Chapman (born 1954), English film and television actor
 Mark Chapman (American football) (born 1994), American football wide receiver

See also
 Marco Allen Chapman (1971–2008), American murderer executed in Kentucky